Hallamshire was a Parliamentary constituency covering the Hallamshire district of England. The constituency was created in 1885 and abolished in 1918. The seat was a large geographical area which in the west included the moors of the Pennines (Howden Moors, Midhope Moors, Broom Read Moor, Bradfield Moor and Hallam Moor), but came down from the hills in the centre to include better farmland north of Sheffield around Ecclesfield. In the north-east it included part of the South Yorkshire coalfield and some mining villages. In the south, the residents of Sheffield who owned their freeholds could vote in this division.

For twenty years the Member of Parliament was the Sheffield cutler and steel manufacturer, Sir Frederick Mappin, who was able to unite the middle-class voters from Sheffield with the hill-farmers and the miners to vote for him as a Liberal. When he retired the local Liberal association selected a miner, John Wadsworth, who was President of the Yorkshire Miners Association in 1903 and sponsored by the Miners' Federation of Great Britain. With the other MFGB sponsored MPs, Wadsworth transferred to the Labour Party in 1909.

Boundaries 
The constituency covered an area north and west of inner Sheffield. On its creation in 1885 it was defined as containing the Municipal Borough of Sheffield, and the Parishes of Bradfield, Ecclesfield, Wath-upon-Dearne, Brampton Bierlow, Wentworth, Handsworth, Tankersley, Nether Hoyland, and Wortley.

The Municipal Borough of Sheffield was also a Parliamentary Borough and so the only electors from that area entitled to vote in Hallamshire were those who were freeholders. They could, of course, also exercise their vote in the appropriate division of the Parliamentary Borough of Sheffield. However, there were always considerable numbers of Sheffield freeholders who voted at elections for Hallamshire according to Henry Pelling in his Social Geography of British Elections 1885-1910.

This anomaly of the electoral system was ended in 1918. The remainder of the constituency formed the cores of both the Penistone and Wentworth constituencies in boundary changes made that year.

Members of Parliament
1885-1906: Sir Frederick Mappin, Liberal
1906-1918: John Wadsworth, Lib-Lab, then Labour

Election results

Elections in the 1880s

Elections in the 1890s

Elections in the 1900s

Elections in the 1910s

Another General Election was required to take place before the end of 1915. The political parties had been making preparations for an election to take place and by July 1914, the following candidates had been selected;
Liberal: John Wadsworth
Labour: Thomas Walter Grundy

References

Sources
Boundary Commission Report, 1885
British Parliamentary Election Results 1885-1918 by F. W. S. Craig (Parliamentary Research Services, Chichester, 1977)
Social Geography of British Elections 1885-1910 by Henry Pelling (Macmillan, London, 1967)

Richard Kimber's Political Science Resources  (Election results since 1951)

Parliamentary constituencies in Yorkshire and the Humber (historic)
Constituencies of the Parliament of the United Kingdom established in 1885
Constituencies of the Parliament of the United Kingdom disestablished in 1918
Politics of Sheffield